Anna Elisabeth de Bruijn (1 January 1920 – 3 October 2018), better known by the stage name of Elisabeth Andersen, was a Dutch actress, primarily in theatre. She was a three-time recipient of the Theo d'Or.

Career
Born in The Hague, Andersen attended drama school in Amsterdam from 1941 to 1943, but did not complete her studies.

Awards
Andersen was a three-time recipient of the Theo d'Or Award (1958, 1966, 1984), the most for any Dutch stage actress. In 1968, she was honored as Knight of the Order of Orange-Nassau.

Personal life
Andersen was married to actor Jan Retèl from 1948 to 1954 and had two children. She died in Haarlem on 3 October 2018 at age 98.

References

1920 births
2018 deaths
Dutch stage actresses
Dutch television actresses
Actresses from The Hague
Knights of the Order of Orange-Nassau